Edith Freilich née Seamon (September 8, 1911 - May 14, 2011) was an American bridge player, "one of the world's greatest female bridge players".
As a player in important tournaments, she was also known as Edith Seligman, Edith Kemp, and Edith Kemp Freilich. Among women, she is second to Helen Sobel Smith for winning the greatest number of North American Bridge Championships. She was from Miami Beach, Florida.

Edith Seamon was raised in South Orange, New Jersey. Her brother, Billy Seamon, and sister, Anne Burnstein, also became leading bridge players.

Freilich won the top two KO events on the ACBL calendar, the Vanderbilt and Spingold, in 1963.

In 1984, her team won the Wagar.

Freilich was inducted into the ACBL Hall of Fame in 1997.

Freilich died in Miami on May 14, 2011.

Bridge accomplishments

Honors

 ACBL Hall of Fame, 1997

Wins

 North American Bridge Championships (30)
 Whitehead Women's Pairs (7) 1941, 1942, 1943, 1946, 1966, 1979, 1986 
 Open Pairs (1928-1962) (1) 1943 
 Smith Life Master Women's Pairs (3) 1977, 1979, 1981 
 Machlin Women's Swiss Teams (1) 1982 
 Vanderbilt (1) 1963 
 Wagar Women's Knockout Teams (8) 1951, 1962, 1965, 1969, 1979, 1980, 1982, 1984 
 Chicago Mixed Board-a-Match (5) 1947, 1952, 1953, 1957, 1974 
 Reisinger (2) 1946, 1952 
 Spingold (2) 1953, 1963

Runners-up

 Venice Cup (1) 1982 
 North American Bridge Championships
 von Zedtwitz Life Master Pairs (1) 1962 
 Whitehead Women's Pairs (2) 1957, 1978 
 Smith Life Master Women's Pairs (4) 1962, 1973, 1974, 1980 
 Grand National Teams (1) 1980 
 Vanderbilt (1) 1960 
 Wagar Women's Knockout Teams (4) 1948, 1955, 1971, 1996 
 Chicago Mixed Board-a-Match (4) 1942, 1945, 1948, 1964 
 Reisinger (1) 1964 
 Spingold (1) 1972

References

External links
 
 
 

2011 deaths
American contract bridge players
Venice Cup players
People from South Orange, New Jersey
People from Miami Beach, Florida
1911 births
Place of birth missing